Leiren or Leira is a village in the municipality of Grane in Nordland county, Norway. The village is located at the northern end of the lake Nedre Fiplingvatnet. The local Fiplingdal Church is located in Leiren, serving the eastern part of Grane.

References

Villages in Nordland
Grane, Nordland